Tiny Titans was a comic book series by Art Baltazar and Franco Aureliani. It was published by DC Comics, beginning publication in February 2008. The first issue was also released as part of the annual Free Comic Book Day promotion in May 2008. The series concluded its run with the 50th issue, released in March 2012 (cover date May 2012). During its history, Tiny Titans won the Eisner Award for Best Series for Kids twice, in 2009 and 2011. In 2014–2015, the series was revived as Tiny Titans: Return to the Tree House, a six-issue miniseries.

Tiny Titans stars alternate versions of DC Universe characters, primarily those from the Teen Titans series. It is set in a kid-friendly, elementary school environment. Issues typically consist of several individual stories as opposed to one cohesive storyline.

Recurring characters and jokes
Although the comical nature of the stories feature a wide variety of characters, several are part of recurring jokes:
 Robin is one of the more featured characters and is generally considered the leader, though no one seems to take him seriously. In one attempt to prove his character, Robin briefly changes his name and costume to Nightwing, but still fails to garner any respect.
 Beast Boy and Terra appear as part of a very one-sided relationship, in which Terra responds to Beast Boy's silly romantic advances by throwing rocks at him.
 Deathstroke (Slade) is the principal of the kids' school, Sidekick City Elementary. The kids tend to think of Principal Slade as a mean guy, and they are usually right.
 Psimon is often called Brainiac because of his exposed brain, and he always has to remind Wonder Girl what his name is, but she does not listen.

The team's catchphrase is "Aw yeah, Titans!", which everyone eventually says, except Miss Martian and Kid Devil, who are infants. The catchphrase has been referenced by many other mainstream comic books.

References to DC continuity
 In Tiny Titans #12, the Monitor is a hall monitor, who is constantly thwarted by the Anti-Monitor.
 In the same issue, Principal Slade leaves Lunch Lady Darkseid in charge of the school. Darkseid declares that the Tiny Titans will have to do their finals that day, and that it is the Finals Crisis.
 In Tiny Titans #13, page 16 shows a "signed portrait" of Dan DiDio, as well as Billy Batson and the Magic of Shazam! #1, Final Crisis #1, The New Teen Titans #1, and Superman #199.
 Issue #17 sees Robin having to claim Batman's cowl, which has been claimed by a cow.
 Issue #25 not only has the return of Conner Kent (Superboy), but the Tiny Titans also get a hold of different colored rings representing the emotional spectrum ring from the Green Lantern comics. Members of the Green Lantern Corps show up to retrieve the rings from the children.

Popular culture references
 Due to Ted Kord being dead, Blue Beetle's guardians are shown to be The Beatles, who quote the titles of their songs.
 In issue #3, Robin and his friends discover penguins with helmets and rockets in the Batcave. It is revealed that they are from "that penguin movie", and the Tiny Titans later suggest they should watch the film to learn how Batman dealt with them.
 In issue #17, Robin again makes a movie reference when he complains about a rubber costume he got for his birthday, saying it feels like he is in a movie.
 In issue #18, when Robin ends up in detention, his continuous talking results in him receiving more detention. Talon then states that one more day would turn his brain to mush.
 The Tiny Titans often have Pet Club meetings with their various pets (e.g., Ace the Bat-Hound or Krypto the Superdog). The first rule of Pet Club is "We don't talk about Pet Club", a reference to the novel Fight Club.
 In issue #13, Wayne Manor is depicted strongly resembling its counterpart from the 1960s Batman television series, just in brighter colors. At the end of the issue, Robin also quips "same bat-time, same bat-channel", a phrase often used at the end of an episode.

Collected editions
{| class="wikitable"
! Vol. # !! Title !! Material collected !! Pages !! ISBN
|-
| 1
| Welcome to the Treehouse
| Tiny Titans #1-6
| 144
| 
|-
| 2
| Adventures in Awesomeness
| Tiny Titans #7-12
| 144
| 
|-
| 3
| Sidekickin' It
| Tiny Titans #13-18
| 144
| 
|-
| 4
| The First Rule of Pet Club...
| Tiny Titans #19-25
| 160
| 
|-
| 5
| Field Trippin'''
| Tiny Titans #26-32
| 160
| 
|-
|6
|The Treehouse and Beyond!|Tiny Titans #33-38
|144
|
|-
| 7
| Growing Up Tiny!| Tiny Titans #39-44
| 128
| 
|-
| 8
| Aw Yeah Titans!| Tiny Titans #45-50
| 128
| 
|-
| (9)
| Return to the Treehouse| Tiny Titans: Return to the Tree House #1-6
| 128
| 
|-
|}

In other media
The Tiny Titans versions of Robin, Cyborg, Starfire, Beast Boy, and Raven appear in Teen Titans Go! vs. Teen Titans. They are summoned alongside other versions of the Teen Titans to take on Hexagon.

See also
 Super Jrs.
 X-Babies
 Mini Marvels''

References

External links
 

2008 comics debuts
DC Comics titles
DC Comics child superheroes
Teen Titans titles